Gerardo del Mazo Morales (born 29 November 1976) is a Mexican politician from the New Alliance Party. From 2009 to 2012 he served as Deputy of the LXI Legislature of the Mexican Congress representing the Federal District.

References

1976 births
Living people
Politicians from Mexico City
New Alliance Party (Mexico) politicians
21st-century Mexican politicians
Deputies of the LXI Legislature of Mexico
Members of the Chamber of Deputies (Mexico) for Mexico City